Fireclay Caverns are located in the heritage-listed Mount Morgan Mine site in Queensland, Australia.

The Fireclay Caverns were excavated by the Mount Morgan Mine to provide clay for its brickworks resulting in very large openings that measure between 4–12 metres in height from the cave floor. Excavation of the caverns ceased when the mine brickworks were decommissioned in the early 1900s. Erosion revealed dinosaur footprints (preserved as infills) being discovered in 1954. To date, nine different ceiling sections of the Fireclay Caverns have been recognised as containing dinosaur footprints. These have been dated to the Early Jurassic (Sinemurian) ~195 million years ago. Walkways and stairs had been constructed in 2010 to provide access to the dinosaur footprints  as part of the mine site tours. The site was closed to access in 2011 due to ceiling erosion posing a significant risk to public safety.

History 
The Fireclay Caverns were excavated to supply clay to brickworks of the Mount Morgan Mine. Clay was mined from within the caverns by pick and shovel, then transferred by underground rail to a brickworks lower in the Mount Morgan Mine site. Excavation from the caverns ceased when their clay was no longer required by the mine.

Dinosaur footprints
After cavern excavations ceased, clay progressively fell from the cavern ceilings, revealing rock ceilings above. In 1953, HRE Staines, a Mount Morgan Limited geologist, identified dinosaur footprints in the rock ceilings. Over 300 such footprints have been identified on the cavern ceilings dated to the Early Jurassic (Sinemurian) ~195 million years ago.

Bent-wing bat colony 
After cavern excavations ceased, a colony of bent-wing bats began inhabiting the caverns. The sections of the caverns containing the bats are inaccessible to protect the bat habitat.

References 

Caves of Queensland
Central Queensland